"Show Me Love" is a song by American singers and songwriters Alicia Keys and Miguel. It was written by Keys, Miguel, Tory Lanez (credited to his legal name Daystar Peterson), and guitarist-producer Morgan Matthews, while production was handled by Keys and Matthews. The song was released on September 17, 2019 through RCA Records with UMPG as the lead single from Keys' seventh studio album Alicia. It is an R&B ballad involving feelings of desire. A remix version of the song featuring rapper 21 Savage was released on November 4, 2019.

The song received positive reviews from music critics, who went on to compliment the chemistry between the duo, as well as praising its sultriness and charm. Commercially, the song debuted on the US Billboard Hot 100 chart at number 90, becoming Keys' first single as a lead artist to debut on that chart in seven years; the last one being "Girl on Fire" (2012). It would also become her eleventh chart topper on Adult R&B Songs, extended her record as the artist with the most number ones on the chart. A music video directed by Cara Stricker was released on the same day, and it features actors Michael B. Jordan, Zoe Saldana and her husband Marco Perego Saldana, alongside Keys and Miguel.

As of August 2020, the song has been certified Gold by the RIAA.

Background
After the release of her sixth studio album, Here (2016), Keys  took a time off from music, and served as coach from the American singing competition series The Voice, where she would remain for three seasons. During 2017, she released a few singles, such as a collaborative track with KAYTRANADA on "Sweet F’n Love" and "That's What's Up", a song that samples Kanye West's "Low Life". Meanwhile, in 2019, she released the acclaimed single Raise a Man", while also embarking on a remix version of the latin successful song "Calma". During the week of its release, Keys posted a series of videos teasing a visual from what was going to be the video for the song. On September 16, 2019, a day before the song's release, Keys announced she was going to release "Show Me Love" with its accompanying music video the following day. On November 4, 2019, Keys released a remixed version of the song featuring rapper 21 Savage.

Critical reception 
Adi Mehta from Entertainment Voice called it a "Spanish guitar laden track" in which "Keys sings in airy, sinuous stretches", exchanging "thrilling harmonies" with Miguel. Konstantinos Pappis from Our Culture Mag wrote that the song “comes off as painfully generic” and named it one of the album’s “weakest spots”.

Live performances
Keys performed the track for the first time during her appearance at the iHeartRadio Music Festival in Las Vegas on September 21, 2019. She also performed the song at Global Citizen Festival on September 28, 2019. In October, Keys performed the song on Jimmy Kimmel Live! from Tidal X Rock the Vote concert. In November, Keys was joined by Miguel, Pedro Capó, and Farruko at the 20th Annual Latin Grammy Awards for a medley of a Spanish version of the song and "Calma" (2019). In June 2020, Keys performed the song on NPR's Tiny Desk Concerts. Keys performed the song at a concert to promote the Alicia album held at Bush Hall in London on February 7, 2020. The song is performed as part of The Alicia + Keys World Tour.

Track listings
Digital download
"Show Me Love" – 3:08

Digital download
"Show Me Love" (Remix) – 3:59

Credits and personnel
"Show Me Love" credits and personnel.

Songwriters – Alicia Keys, Daystar Peterson, Morgan Matthews, Miguel Pimentel
Producers – Alicia Keys, Morgan Matthews
Recording engineer – Ann Mincieli
Engineer – Chris Galland
Mastering engineer – Dave Kutch
Mixing engineer – Manny Marroquin
Assistant engineers – Jeremie Inhaber, Brendan Morawski, Andrew Keller, Scott Desmarais
Associated performers – Alicia Keys, Miguel
Guitars – Raphael Saadiq, Morgan Matthews

Charts

Weekly charts

Year-end charts

Certifications

References

2019 songs
2019 singles
Alicia Keys songs
Miguel (singer) songs
Songs written by Alicia Keys
Songs written by Miguel (singer)
Songs written by Tory Lanez
RCA Records singles
2010s ballads
Contemporary R&B ballads